Iolaus laonides, the emerald sapphire, is a butterfly in the family Lycaenidae. It is found in Sierra Leone, Ivory Coast, Ghana, Nigeria (east and the Cross River loop) and Cameroon. The habitat consists of forests.

References

External links

Die Gross-Schmetterlinge der Erde 13: Die Afrikanischen Tagfalter. Plate XIII 67 e

Butterflies described in 1898
Iolaus (butterfly)
Butterflies of Africa
Taxa named by Per Olof Christopher Aurivillius